The Asia-Pacific Rally Championship (APRC) is an international rally championship organized by the FIA encompassing rounds in Asia and Oceania. Group N cars dominated the championship for many years but in recent years cars built to R5 and S2000 regulations have tended to be the frontrunners.

The championship was first held in 1988, created out of the successful expansion of the World Rally Championship into Asia and linking with the debut of Rally Australia and won by Japan's Kenjiro Shinozuka in a Mitsubishi Galant VR-4. Initially the championship had strong support from World Rally Championship teams, aided by more than half the calendar being WRC rallies and by Japanese manufacturers backing half of the front runners with Mazda, Toyota, Mitsubishi and Subaru all running front running teams. Toyota's double World Rally Champion Carlos Sainz won the championship in 1990, Juha Kankkunen, Didier Auriol, Colin McRae, Tommi Makinen, Richard Burns, Richard Burns and Ari Vatanen all won rallies. Several WRC teams used the championship as a junior development squad. By the late 1990s, the big teams were dropping away from the championship, or were running drivers from the region. The 2000 Rally New Zealand was the last joint WRC/APRC event and the WRC teams and manufacturers left and regional teams, like Subaru's New Zealand based team and regional manufacturers like Proton were sharing the wins with privately run teams.

The shift to Group N and away from WRC regulations assisted as only Subaru and Mitsubishi had eligible cars for Group N. By the mid-2000s the teams were all privateers. The growth of Super 2000 regulations saw manufacturer teams return led by Proton.

In recent years (since 2013) Skoda have used the championship to develop young European-based drivers, with Esapekka Lappi, Jan Kopecký, Pontus Tidemand and Ole Christian Veiby all going on to compete at WRC WRC-2 level.

The championship has also been a proving ground for regional talent, even when World Rally teams were competing regional drivers from Japan, Australia and New Zealand. Malaysian driver Karamjit Singh brought the first victory for a driver from one of the emerging APRC nations with Jean-Louis Leyraud from the French pacific island of New Caledonia and India's Gaurav Gill followed. The occasional European driver has moved into the region to find a cheaper series to compete in instead of the expensive European Rally Championship, like Jussi Valimaki.

Reflecting its roots as a subsidiary of the World Rally Championship it had class championships within the main championship for Group N cars and naturally aspirated Two Litre cars. In ore modern times the sub-classes have been split geographically rather than technically, allowing competitors to compete for smaller portions of the series to bolster flagging entry numbers. The championships created were the Asia Cup, taking in Asian continent events in Japan, Indonesia, Malaysia and China with Thailand joining in 2003. The Pacific Cup takes in Oceania events in Australia, New Zealand and New Caledonia.

By taking victory at the 2009 Indonesian Rally, Australian Cody Crocker became the most successful driver in APRC history, winning his fourth consecutive title, all in Subarus. A trio of drivers have won three APRC titles; New Zealander Possum Bourne, Kenneth Eriksson of Sweden, and Malaysia's Karamjit Singh.

The championship presently has events in New Zealand, Australia, Malaysia, Japan, China and India. In the past the championship has run events in New Caledonia, Thailand and Indonesia.

List of events
Sourced from:

APRC Champions 
Sourced from:

Asia Cup

Pacific Cup

Group N

2 Litre

Manufacturers

See also
FIA Asia-Pacific Rally Championship
Middle East Rally Championship
Asia Road Racing Championship

References

External links
Official website
APRC Live Podcast
APRC News and Video
FIA Asia-Pacific Rally Championship

 
FIA Zone rally championships